Dennis Blundell (17 June 1921 – December 2003) was a British speed skater. He competed in three events at the 1948 Winter Olympics.

References

1921 births
2003 deaths
British male speed skaters
Olympic speed skaters of Great Britain
Speed skaters at the 1948 Winter Olympics
Sportspeople from Birmingham, West Midlands